The 1985 Virginia Slims of Central New York was a women's tennis tournament played on outdoor hard courts in Monticello, New York in the United States. It was part of the 1985 WTA Tour and was played from August 19 through August 25, 1985. It was the first tournament in Monticello and the first in New York to feature both singles and doubles competitions. Second-seeded Barbara Potter won the singles title.

Finals

Singles
 Barbara Potter defeated  Helen Kelesi 4–6, 6–3, 6–2

Doubles
 Mercedes Paz /  Gabriela Sabatini defeated  Andrea Holíková /  Kateřina Böhmová 5–7, 6–4, 6–3

References

External links
 ITF tournament edition details

Virginia Slims of New York
Virginia Slims Of Central New York, 1985
Central New York
Virginia Slims of Central New York
Virginia Slims of Central New York
Virginia Slims of Central New York